Oga or OGA may refer to:

Places
 Oga, Akita, Tōhoku, Japan
 Oga Peninsula, Japan
 Oga, a frazione of Valdisotto, Italy

People
 Oga Atsushi, a Japanese sumo wrestler
 My Oga at the top, Nigerian Pidgin English term for "boss" or "leader"
Aragami Oga, a virtual YouTuber affiliated with Hololive Production

As an acronym and initialism 
 Office Genuine Advantage in Microsoft Office
 Oil and Gas Authority, regulator of oil and gas operations in the United Kingdom
 Old Gaffers Association
 Open Genealogy Alliance
 OGA, the IATA airport code for Searle Field airport, Ogallala, Nebraska

Other uses
 Oga (Gojoseon), a political structure in the ancient Asian kingdoms of Gojoseon and Buyeo
 .oga, an Ogg file containing audio
 Protein O-GlcNAcase, an enzyme that removes the post-translational modification O-GlcNAc

See also
Olga (disambiguation)

de:OGA